Erskine L. Seeley House is a historic home located at Stamford in Delaware County, New York.  It was built about 1890 and is a -story, balloon frame house clad in wood clapboard siding on a bluestone foundation. The front facade features a 2-story, three-sided, canted bay window under a large projecting gable. Also on the property is a small carriage house converted to a garage in the early 20th century.

It was added to the National Register of Historic Places in 2010.

References

Houses on the National Register of Historic Places in New York (state)
Houses completed in 1890
Houses in Delaware County, New York
National Register of Historic Places in Delaware County, New York